Florian Lorenz Müller (born 13 November 1997) is a German professional footballer who plays as a goalkeeper for Bundesliga club VfB Stuttgart.

Club career
Müller playing football with FV Lebach until he joined 1. FC Saarbrücken. He played at Saarbrücken until he joined in the youth academy of Mainz 05 in 2013. In Mainz he played for the U-17 and U-19 teams, and on 1 July 2016 he signed a professional contract for the second team, playing in the 3. Liga.

In the 3. Liga, Müller made his competitive debut during the 2015–16 season when he played in the 5–1 defeat to Chemnitzer FC on matchday 32, taking the place of goalkeeper Jannik Huth.

For the 2016–17 season, Müller was included in Mainz's first team squad, playing in the Bundesliga.

On 15 September 2020, Müller joined SC Freiburg on a season-long loan deal. As a result, Müller initially became the first-choice goalkeeper ahead of Benjamin Uphoff and Mark Flekken, following Alexander Schwolow's departure to Hertha BSC.

On 16 June 2021, Müller signed a four-year-deal with VfB Stuttgart.

International career
In October 2015, Müller was called up by the coach of the Germany national under-19 team, Marcus Sorg. He made his debut on 9 October 2015 during the 1–0 victory in the friendly match against the Mexico national under-19 football team, after coming on at the start of the second half for Timo Königsmann. He also made additional appearances in friendlies against the under-19 teams of Serbia on 15 November 2015 and South Korea on 29 March 2016, both ending in 1–0 wins.

References

External links

1997 births
Living people
People from Saarlouis
Footballers from Saarland
German footballers
Footballers at the 2020 Summer Olympics
Association football goalkeepers
Germany youth international footballers
Germany under-21 international footballers
Olympic footballers of Germany
Bundesliga players
3. Liga players
Regionalliga players
1. FSV Mainz 05 players
1. FSV Mainz 05 II players
SC Freiburg players
VfB Stuttgart players